Greengrass is a surname. Notable people with the surname include:

Jessie Greengrass (born 1982), British poet and author
Jim Greengrass (born 1927), former professional baseball player
John Greengrass, New Zealand rugby league footballer 
Ken Greengrass (1926–2014), American music and television producer
Paul Greengrass (born 1955), English film director, screenwriter and former journalist

Fictional characters
Astoria Greengrass, character from J. K. Rowling's Harry Potter series
Barney Greengrass, restaurant on the Upper West Side of Manhattan
Claude Greengrass character from the British period police drama Heartbeat